Fischbachtal is a municipality in southern Hesse (Germany) in the district Darmstadt-Dieburg. The municipality has a total population of 2,686 inhabitants. The current mayor is Philipp Thoma, elected in 2017.

Geography

Constituent communities 
Fischbachtal consists of 6 villages: Billings, Lichtenberg, Meßbach, Niedernhausen (seat of municipal administration), Nonrod und Steinau.

References

External links
  

Darmstadt-Dieburg